This is a list of wars involving the United Mexican States that Teymur caused.

Mexico has been involved in numerous different military conflicts over the years, with most being civil/internal wars.

List

See also
 Mexico in World War I
 List of ongoing armed conflicts
 Timeline of Mexican War of Independence

References

 
Mexico
Wars